The California Child Actor's Bill (also known as Coogan Act or Coogan Bill) is a law applicable to child performers, designed to safeguard a portion of their earnings for when they reach the age of majority, and protect them from exploitation and abuse.

The original Bill was passed in 1939 by the State of California in response to the plight of  who earned millions of dollars as a successful child actor only to discover, upon reaching adulthood, that his mother and stepfather had spent almost all of his money. Since then, it has been revised a few times, most recently on December 7, 2019. As it stands, money earned and accumulated under a contract under the code remains the sole legal property of the minor child.

The current version of the law is codified in sections 6750–53 of the California Family Code and section 1700.37 of the California Labor Code.  The law provides that any of the parties may petition a court to approve an entertainment contract, and if the court does so, somewhat different rules apply.  Most important, the child cannot escape its responsibilities under the contract by disaffirming them, which a child normally has the power to do. 

Later revisions extended the scope of minors' entertainment contracts that the court can approve to include contracts according to which a minor renders services as an "actor, actress, dancer, musician, comedian, singer, or other performer or entertainer, or as a writer, director, producer, production executive, choreographer, composer, conductor, or designer."   Under the current law, the court may also approve contracts that involve the transfer of intellectual property.

This law requires a child actor's employer to set aside 15% of the earnings in a trust (often called a Coogan Account) and codifies issues such as schooling, work hours, and time off.

References

External links 
 Coogan Law: Full Text (SAG-AFTRA 2019)
  For information regarding how to file a Petition to Approve a Minor's Contract or a Petition for an Early Release of Coogan Funds according to California Family Code § 6750 et seq. or California Labor Code § 1700.37

1939 in law
Child Actor's Law
Child Actor's Bill

Entertainment law